Kahl is a German surname. Notable people with the surname include:

Alfred Kahl (1877–1946), German academic
Bruno Kahl (1914–1999), German Wehrmacht officer
Chris Kahl (born 1977), American musician
Daniel Kahl (born 1960), American-Japanese television personality
Gordon Kahl (1920–1983), American animator
Margot Kahl (born 1961), Chilean engineer and television host
Milt Kahl (1909–1987), American animator
Nick Kahl (politician) (born 1977), American politician
Nick Kahl (baseball) (1879–1959), American baseball player
Oscar Kahl (born 1997), Thai football player
Thede Kahl (born 1971), German academic

German-language surnames